Jujube, sometimes jujuba, known by the scientific name Ziziphus jujuba and also called red date, Chinese date, and Chinese jujube, is a species in the genus Ziziphus in the buckthorn family Rhamnaceae.

Description
There is a single hard kernel, similar to an olive pit, containing two seeds.

Chemistry 
Leaves contain saponin and ziziphin, which suppresses the ability to perceive sweet taste.

Flavinoids found in the fruits include Kaempferol 3-O-rutinoside, Quercetine 3-O-robinobioside, Quercetine 3-O-rutinoside. Terpenoids such as colubrinic acid and alphitolic acid were found in the fruits.

Taxonomy
The ultimate source of the name is Ancient Greek  zízyphon. A descendant of the Latin word into a Romance language, which may have been French  or medieval Latin , in turn gave rise to the common English jujube. This name is not related to jojoba, which is a loan from Spanish , itself borrowed from hohohwi, the name of that plant in a Native American language.

The binomial name has a curious nomenclatural history, due to a combination of botanical naming regulations, and variations in spelling. It was first named in the binomial system by Carl Linnaeus as Rhamnus zizyphus, in Species Plantarum (1753). Philip Miller, in his Gardener's Dictionary, considered that the jujube and its relatives were sufficiently distinct from Rhamnus to be placed in a separate genus (as it had already been by the pre-Linnaean author Tournefort in 1700), and in the 1768 edition he gave it the name Ziziphus jujuba (using Tournefort's spelling for the genus name). For the species name, he used a different name, as tautonyms (repetition of exactly the same name in the genus and species) are not permitted in botanical naming. However, because of Miller's slightly different spelling, the combination of the earlier species name (from Linnaeus) with the new genus, Ziziphus zizyphus, is not a tautonym, and was therefore permitted as a botanical name. This combination was made by Hermann Karsten in 1882. In 2006, a proposal was made to suppress the name Ziziphus zizyphus in favor of Ziziphus jujuba, and this proposal was accepted in 2011. Ziziphus jujuba is thus the correct scientific name for this species.

Distribution and habitat 
Its precise natural distribution is uncertain due to extensive cultivation, but its origin is thought to be in southern Asia, between Lebanon, northern India, and southern and central China, and possibly also southeastern Europe though more likely introduced there. 
The plant in Arabic and Persian is known as "Enab (عناب)", and is known as the "hinap" or "finab" in the eastern part of Bulgaria. It grows wild but is also a garden shrub, kept for its fruit. The fruit is picked in the autumn.

The tree tolerates a wide range of temperatures and rainfall, though it requires hot summers and sufficient water for acceptable fruiting. The jujube (Z. jujuba) grows in cooler regions of Asia. Five or more other species of Ziziphus are widely distributed in milder climates to hot deserts of Asia and Africa.

This plant has been introduced in Madagascar and grows as an invasive species in the western part of the island, threatening mostly protected areas. It is cultivated in parts of southern California.

Ecology

Witch's broom, prevalent in China and Korea, is the main disease affecting jujubes, though plantings in North America currently are not affected by any pests or diseases. In Europe, the last several years have seen some 80%–90% of the jujube crop eaten by insect larvae (see picture), including those of the false codling moth, Thaumatotibia (Cryptophlebia) leucotreta.

In Madagascar, it is widely eaten by free-ranging zebus, and its seeds grow easily in zebu feces.

Cultivation 
Jujube was domesticated in South Asia by 9000 BC. Over 400 cultivars have been selected.

Varieties
Chico (also called GI 7-62) developed by the United States Department of Agriculture (USDA) in the 1950s
Li, major commercial variety in the US
Shanxi li, very large fruit
Lang, major commercial variety in the US
Sherwood 
Silverhill (also known as Yu and Tigertooth) can be grown in areas with high humidity
So
Shui Men
GA 866
Honey jar, small juicy fruit
Sugar cane
Winter delight, major commercial variety in China

Uses

Culinary 
The freshly harvested, as well as the candied dried fruit, are often eaten as a snack, or with coffee. Smoked jujubes are consumed in Vietnam and are referred to as black jujubes. A drink can be made by crushing the pulp in water. Both China and Korea produce a sweetened tea syrup containing jujube fruit in glass jars, and canned jujube tea or jujube tea in the form of teabags. To a lesser extent, jujube fruit is made into juice and jujube vinegar (called 枣 醋 or 红枣 醋 in Chinese). They are used for making pickles (কুলের আচার) in west Bengal and Bangladesh. In Assam it is known as "Bogori" and is famous for Bogori aachar (বগৰি আচাৰ). In China, a wine made from jujube fruit is called hong zao jiu (红枣酒).

Sometimes pieces of jujube fruit are preserved by storing them in a jar filled with baijiu (Chinese liquor), which allows them to be kept fresh for a long time, especially through the winter. Such jujubes are called zui zao (醉枣; literally "drunk jujube"). The fruit is also a significant ingredient in a wide variety of Chinese delicacies (e.g. 甑糕 jing gao, a steamed rice cake).

In Vietnam and Taiwan, fully mature, nearly ripe fruit is harvested and sold on the local markets and also exported to Southeast Asian countries. The dried fruit is used in desserts in China and Vietnam, such as ching bo leung, a cold beverage that includes the dried jujube, longan, fresh seaweed, barley, and lotus seeds.

In Korea, jujubes are called daechu (대추) and are used in daechucha and samgyetang.

In Croatia, especially Dalmatia, jujubes are used in marmalades, juices, and rakija (fruit brandy).

On his visit to Medina, the 19th-century English explorer, Sir Richard Burton, observed that the local variety of jujube fruit was widely eaten. He describes its taste as like "a bad plum, an unripe cherry, and an insipid apple." He gives the local names for three varieties as "Hindi (Indian), Baladi (native), Tamri (date-like)." A hundred years ago, a close variety was common in the Jordan valley and around Jerusalem. The bedouin valued the fruit, calling it nabk. It could be dried and kept for winter or made into a paste which was used as bread.

In Persian cuisine, the dried drupes are known as annab, while in neighboring Armenia, it is commonly eaten as a snack, and is known as unab. Confusion in the common name apparently is widespread. The unab is Z. jujuba. Rather, ber is used for three other cultivated or wild species, e.g., Z. spina-christi, Z. mauritiana and Z. nummularia in parts of India and is eaten both fresh and dried. The Arabic name sidr is used for Ziziphus species other than Z. jujuba.

Traditionally in India, the fruits are dried in the sun and the hard seeds removed, after which the dried flesh is pounded with tamarind, red chillies, salt, and jaggery. In some parts of the Indian state of Tamil Nadu, fresh whole ripe fruit is crushed with the above ingredients and sun-dried to make cakes called ilanthai vadai or regi vadiyalu (Telugu). It is also commonly consumed as a snack.

In Northern and Northeastern India the fruit is eaten fresh with salt and chilli flakes and also preserved as candy, jam or pickle with oil and spices.

In Madagascar, jujube fruit is eaten fresh or dried. People also use it to make jam. A jujube honey is produced in the Atlas Mountains of Morocco.

Italy has an alcoholic syrup called brodo di giuggiole.
In Senegal and The Gambia, Jujube is called Sii dem or Ceedem, and the fruit is used as snack and also turned into a dried paste favoured as a sweetmeat by schoolchildren. More recently it has been processed and sold in Dakar by women.

In Australia jujube beer is made.

The commercial jujube candy popular in movie theaters originally contained jujube juice but now uses other flavorings.

Traditional Chinese medicine
The fruit and its seeds are used in Chinese and Korean traditional medicine, where they are believed to alleviate stress, and traditionally for anti-fungal, anti-bacterial, anti-ulcer, anti-inflammatory purposes and sedation, antispastic, antifertility/contraception, hypotensive and antinephritic, cardiotonic, antioxidant, immunostimulant, and wound healing properties. It is among the fruits used in Kampo. Jujube, along with Gan Cao, is used in Chinese medicine to harmonize and moderate other herbs.

Jujube fruit is also combined with other herbs to treat colds and influenza. The fruit contains many different healthy properties like Vitamins, amino acids. The use of the fruit can be helpful for spleen diseases in Chinese medicine.

Other uses
In Japan, the natsume has given its name to a style of tea caddy used in the Japanese tea ceremony, due to the similar shape. Its hard, oily wood was, along with pear, used for woodcuts to print books starting in the 8th century and continuing through the 19th in China and neighboring countries. As many as 2000 copies could be produced from one jujube woodcut.

In China, the leaves are sometimes picked for teas, such as by families in Laoshan Village, Shandong Province, China, where it counts as a variety of herbal tea.

The timber is sometimes used for small items, such as tuning pegs for instruments. Select grade Jujube timber is often used in traditional Asian instruments for fingerboard, pegs, rests & soundposts, ribs & necks etc. It has a medium to hard density similar to luthier grade European maple and has excellent tonal qualities. Jujube Wood can be found in local folk instruments from Ceylon/India thru to China/Korea; it is also commonly used in China in violin & cello making for overseas export, though usually stained black to imitate the look of ebony. Luthier grade jujube wood planes and carves beautifully.

Culture 
In Arabic-speaking regions the jujube and alternatively the species Z. lotus are closely related to the lote-trees (sing. "سدرة sidrah", pl. " سدر sidr") which are mentioned in the Quran, while in Palestine it is rather the species Z. spina-christi that is called sidr.

An ancient jujube tree in the city Al-Qurnah, Iraq, is claimed by locals as the Tree of Knowledge mentioned in the Bible. Local tradition holds that the place where the city was built was the original site of the Garden of Eden (a passage in the Book of Genesis creation narrative says that a river flowed from the garden and split into Tigris and Euphrates rivers, where is the city currently). The tree is a tourist spot in the town.

See also

References

Further reading
Fruits of Warm Climates. Julia. F. Morton, Yan Lin Aung, FL: 1986.

External links
Nutritional data for the jujube

Ziziphus
Trees of Asia
Fruits originating in Asia
Flora of temperate Asia
Flora of tropical Asia
Flora of the Indian subcontinent
Trees of Mediterranean climate
Dietary supplements
Medicinal plants of Asia
Plants used in traditional Chinese medicine
Iranian cuisine
Plants described in 1753
Garden plants of Asia
Ornamental trees
Drought-tolerant trees
Drupes